Ministry for Naval Affairs, established in 1840, was at the time one of the eight ministries, in which the Swedish government administration was divided into. The Ministry for Naval Affairs was established in connection with the ministry reform in 1840. Land defence and naval defence affairs, which had previously been dealt with in the War Office (Krigsexpeditionen), was now divided into two different ministries. The two ministries was in 1920 merge into the newly established Ministry of Defence.

History
According to the Royal Charter of 31 March 1900, this ministry should prepare and present the following matters: naval defense organizing and maintenance, for naval defense related personnel and equipment; the disposition of the funds allocated to the naval defense, as well as educational institutions, church and medical affairs, as well as pension and charitable institutions for the fleet staff; boatswain allotment and rotation; care for residences, buildings and facilities for the naval defense needs; the Nautical Chart Department and Nautical Meteorological Agency (Nautisk-meteorologiska byrån); tonnage measurement; the Maritime Pilot and Lighthouse Institution (Lots- och fyrinrättningen) with lifesaving institutions at Swedish coasts; educational and training establishments for the shipping industry.

The matters were presented before the King in Council by the head of the ministry, who officially held the title "Minister and Head of the Royal Ministry for Naval Affairs" but was colloquially called Minister for Naval Affairs. He was also the rapporteur before the king in command cases regarding the fleet. For preparing these matters, the head of the ministry had a department of the Royal Chancery (Kunglig Majestäts kansli), which in 1916 consisted of 1 permanent undersecretary, two administrative officers (one of whom for a special fee was handling some tasks, which in other government departments was handled by the bureau chief), 1 extra rapporteurs, one registrar and an unspecified number of extra workers (assistants).

To the Ministry for Naval Affairs belongs the Military Office (Kommandoexpedition) of the Ministry for Naval Affairs, the Royal Swedish Naval Materiel Administration, the Fleet Staff, navy personnel, naval stations and for employees subordinate to the Ministry for Naval Affairs, education, health care, pension and other institutions; the Coastal Artillery; the Royal Swedish Society of Naval Sciences; the Nautical Chart Department, Nautical Meteorological Agency; the Maritime Pilot Board (Lotsstyrelsen), the Maritime Pilot Administration (Lotsverket); the navigation schools; foundations intended for staff subordinate to the Ministry for Naval Affairs. Before the 1840 ministry reform, the matters, which now belonged to the minister and the head of Ministry for Naval Affairs, were dealt by the State Secretary of the War Office and the adjutant general of the fleets.

Location
Ministry for Naval Affairs' office and the Military Office was located during the years 1840-1850 at Stenbockska palatset at Birger Jarls torg 4. In 1850 the ministry moved to Birger Jarls torg 11, where it remained until 1909. The ministry then moved to Arvfurstens palats, where its offices were located until the ministry was merge into the Ministry of Defence in 1920.

Ministers
Chiefs:

1840–1844: Johan Lagerbjelke
1844–1848: Carl August Gyllengranat
1848–1849: Johan Fredrik Ehrenstam
1848–1849: Karl Ludvig von Hohenhausen (acting)
1849–1852: Baltzar von Platen
1852–1857: Carl Ulner
1857–1862: Carl Magnus Ehnemark
1862–1868: Baltzar von Platen
1868–1870: Magnus Thulstrup
1870–1874: Abraham Leijonhufvud
1874–1880: Fredrik von Otter
1880–1892: Carl-Gustaf von Otter
1892–1898: Jarl Christersson
1898–1901: Gerhard Dyrssen
1901–1905: Louis Palander
1905–1905: Arvid Lindman
1905–1906: Ludvig Sidner
1906–1907: Wilhelm Dyrssen
1907–1910: Carl-August Ehrensvärd
1910–1911: Henning von Krusenstierna
1911–1914: Jacob Larsson
1914–1917: Dan Broström
1917–1917: Hans Ericson
1917–1920: Erik Palmstierna
1920–1920: Bernhard Eriksson

Permanent Undersecretaries

1840–1848: Sven Vilhelm Gynther
1848–1855: Curt Fredrik Meinander (acting until 1852)
1855–1869: Malcolm von Schantz
1869–1870: Fredrik Reinhold Lorichs
1870–1882: Carl Nordenfalk
1882–1895: Rudolf Emil Eckerström
1895–1903: Carl Johan Wall
1903–1905: Carl Hederstierna
1905–1906: Vacant
1906–1908: Henrik Wolff
1908–1909: Eugen Björklund
1909–1915: Erik Planting-Gyllenbåga
1915–1920: Abraham Unger

Footnotes

References

Naval Affairs
Sweden
Sweden, Naval Affairs
Sweden, Naval Affairs